Luis Antonio Meléndez Santana (born August 11, 1949) is a former professional baseball player. He played all or part of eight seasons in Major League Baseball from 1970 until 1977, for the St. Louis Cardinals and San Diego Padres, primarily as an outfielder. He was traded from the Cardinals to the Padres for Bill Greif on May 19, 1976.

Following his playing career, Meléndez was a minor league manager and coach in the Cardinals and Phillies systems, winning the South Atlantic League championship with the Savannah Cardinals in 1994. He has also managed in the Puerto Rico Baseball League. He was most recently a coach for the Gulf Coast Phillies from 2006 to 2009.

References

External links

1948 births
Living people
People from Aibonito, Puerto Rico
Major League Baseball outfielders
St. Louis Cardinals players
San Diego Padres players
Cedar Rapids Cardinals players
Arkansas Travelers players
Tulsa Oilers (baseball) players
Hawaii Islanders players
Syracuse Chiefs players
Major League Baseball players from Puerto Rico
Minor league baseball managers
Caribbean Series managers